The Classic of Music was a Confucian classic text lost by the time of the Han dynasty. It is sometimes referred to as the "Sixth Classic" (for example, by Sima Qian) and is thought to have been important in the traditional interpretations of the Book of Songs.

Qing dynasty scholar Shao Yichen (邵懿辰, 18101861) proposed that the book never existed, but more usually it is thought that all copies were destroyed during the burning of books and burying of scholars.

A few traces remain in other surviving works, including the Zuo Zhuan, the Rites of Zhou, and the extremely redacted, poor-quality Record of Music contained in the Classic of Rites. As accounted in the Book of Han, Dou Gong 竇公 (5-4 cc. BC), a musician of the state of Wei possessed a copy of the Classic of Music which was presented to the Emperor Han Wen-di. However, the text is associated with the Da siyue (大宗伯) section of the Rites of Zhou. Leading to the belief that the Classic of Music is a section of the Rites of Zhou itself. 

In 2022, Luke Waring has suggested that there is not enough convincing evidence that a music classic existed during the Warring States era in the first place. However, this topic remains heavily debated amongst scholars.

References
 "The Shih Ching or Book of Poetry". The China Journal of Science and Arts, Vol. IV, No. I (Jan 1926).
 Sima Qian Records of the Historian: Chapters from the Shih Chi of Ssu-ma Ch'ien. Translated by Burton Watson (1969). New York: Columbia University Press. .

Notes

Chinese classic texts
Lost literature
Chinese music
Confucian texts
Zhou dynasty texts
1st-millennium BC books
Four Books and Five Classics